Gustav Július Geyer (1828–1900) was a Hungarian educator and entomologist.

References

1828 births
1900 deaths
Hungarian educators
Hungarian entomologists
People from Bielsko-Biała